UAAP Season 60 is the 1997–98 athletic year of the University Athletic Association of the Philippines, which was hosted by Adamson University.

Basketball

Men's tournament

Elimination round

Playoffs

Championships summary

Seniors' division championships

Juniors' division championships

Overall championship race
The host school is boldfaced. Final.

Juniors' division

Seniors' division

External links
UAAPForums.com

 
1997 in multi-sport events
1997 in Philippine sport
60